Raphael Raymundo de Oliveira (born 5 February 1979) is a Brazilian former sprinter who competed in the 2000 Summer Olympics.

References

1979 births
Living people
Brazilian male sprinters
Olympic athletes of Brazil
Athletes (track and field) at the 2000 Summer Olympics
World Athletics Championships medalists
Pan American Games medalists in athletics (track and field)
Pan American Games gold medalists for Brazil
Athletes (track and field) at the 1999 Pan American Games
Medalists at the 1999 Pan American Games
20th-century Brazilian people
21st-century Brazilian people